Myosmine is an alkaloid found in tobacco and other plants. Chemically, it is closely related to nicotine. It inhibits aromatase seven fold more potently than nicotine. It also releases dopamine in adult but not adolescent rats.

See also 
 Catharanthine
 Nicotelline
 Pozanicline
 PHA-543,613

References 

Nicotinic agonists
Pyridine alkaloids
Pyrrolidines
Alkaloids found in Nicotiana
3-Pyridyl compounds